Ward is the third most populous city in Lonoke County, Arkansas, United States. The population was 4,067 at the 2010 census. It is part of the Little Rock–North Little Rock–Conway Metropolitan Statistical Area.

Geography

The city is divided into three wards, progressing from the northeast to the southwest. In the city's first ward is its downtown, which is situated diagonally along a railroad line running parallel to Arkansas Highway 367 (the former path of U.S. Highway 67). The second ward contains the central portion of the city, its industrial area, and its access to the current U.S. Highway 67/167 (Future Interstate 57). Arkansas Highway 319 (Peyton Street within the city south of Highway 367) is a primary thoroughfare in central Ward toward the southwestern section of the city. Some of the most recent development is in the city's third ward, situated mostly along Peyton Street, south of Wilson Street into the Old Austin community and Arkansas Highway 38; a small detached portion of the ward is located to the northwest along the railroad line and Arkansas Highway 367. Ward Central Elementary, the city's campus of the Cabot School District, is located in the larger portion of the third ward.

Government
Ward is governed by a mayor-council form of municipal government, with a mayor, city clerk, and six-member city council, as well as five city departments — fire, police, street maintenance, utilities (water and wastewater) and Park and Recreation. City administration is housed in the former Ward Elementary School.

Demographics

2020 census

As of the 2020 United States census, there were 6,052 people, 1,703 households, and 1,331 families residing in the city.

2000 census
As of the census of 2000, there were 2,580 people, 938 households, and 726 families residing in the city. The racial makeup of the city was 97.33% White, 0.19% Black or African American, 0.78% Native American, 0.39% Asian, 0.16% from other races, and 1.16% from two or more races.  1.94% of the population were Hispanic or Latino of any race.

There were 938 households, out of which 46.7% had children under the age of 18 living with them, 60.3% were married couples living together, 12.4% had a female householder with no husband present, and 22.6% were non-families. 18.1% of all households were made up of individuals, and 5.1% had someone living alone who was 65 years of age or older.  The average household size was 2.75 and the average family size was 3.13.

In the city, the population was spread out, with 32.9% under the age of 18, 9.1% from 18 to 24, 33.3% from 25 to 44, 16.9% from 45 to 64, and 7.7% who were 65 years of age or older.  The median age was 29 years. For every 100 females, there were 95.6 males.  For every 100 females age 18 and over, there were 91.4 males.

The median income for a household in the city was $32,924, and the median income for a family was $34,702. Males had a median income of $30,275 versus $21,151 for females. The per capita income for the city was $13,581.  About 13.6% of families and 16.5% of the population were below the poverty line, including 18.8% of those under age 18 and 18.0% of those age 65 or over.

Education
Public education for early childhood, elementary and secondary school students is provided from Cabot Public Schools, which leads to graduation from Cabot High School.

References

External links
Official Website

Cities in Lonoke County, Arkansas
Cities in Arkansas
Cities in Little Rock–North Little Rock–Conway metropolitan area